Poplar Bay is a summer village in Alberta, Canada. It is located on the western shore of Pigeon Lake.

Demographics 

In the 2016 Census of Population conducted by Statistics Canada, the Summer Village of Poplar Bay had a population of 103 living in 46 of its 179 total private dwellings, a  change from its 2011 population of 80.

See also 
List of communities in Alberta
List of summer villages in Alberta
List of resort villages in Saskatchewan

References

External links 

1967 establishments in Alberta
Summer villages in Alberta